Marino Quaresimin (22 November 1937 – 20 March 2020) was an Italian politician who served as mayor of Vicenza from 1995 to 1998.

Biography
He was born in Vicenza, Italy. Quaresimin was Mayor of Vicenza from 1995 to 1998. During his political career, he was a member of the Italian People's Party, but later switched to The Daisy party. From 1999 to 2008, he was a member of the Vicenza city council. 

Quaresimin died in Vicenza from COVID-19 on 20 March 2020, aged 82, during the COVID-19 pandemic in Italy.

Honors
  Order of Merit of the Italian Republic (5th Class/Knight)
  Order of Merit of the Italian Republic (3rd Class/Commander)

References

1937 births
2020 deaths
Deaths from the COVID-19 pandemic in Veneto
Mayors of Vicenza
People from Vicenza
Politicians of Veneto